State Route 129 (SR 129) is a  state highway in Fayette and Marion counties in the northwestern part of the U.S. state of Alabama. The southern terminus of the highway is at U.S. Route 43 (US 43) and SR 171 north of Fayette. The northern terminus of the highway is at an intersection with SR 13 in Haleyville.

Route description

SR 129 begins at an intersection with US 43/SR 171 north of Fayette. After only , SR 129 intersects SR 102. While going through the town of Glen Allen, SR 129 intersects the southern terminus of SR 233. Then, SR 129 enters Marion County. While heading north toward Brilliant, SR 129 has an interchange with Interstate 22 (I-22)/US 78/SR 4 then heads north to Brilliant through wooded areas. Before reaching its northern terminus, SR 129 intersects US 278 (internally designated as SR 74) and SR 241. SR 129 reaches its northern terminus, at an intersection with SR 13 in Haleyville.

Major intersections

See also

References

External links

129
Transportation in Fayette County, Alabama
Transportation in Marion County, Alabama